Afag Sultanova (born 20 February 1987 in Baku) is a visually impaired Paralympic judoka. She started in karate, but took up judo at thirteen. She originally competed as an able-bodied individual and had success in it. She was European Youth and World Champion in 2008. After an injury impaired her vision she considered giving up judo, but was later inspired by the story of Ilham Zakiyev so returned as a Paralympian. She went on to win a gold medal in Judo at the 2012 Summer Paralympics.

References

External links 
 
 

Paralympic judoka of Azerbaijan
Paralympic gold medalists for Azerbaijan
Judoka at the 2012 Summer Paralympics
Sportspeople from Baku
1987 births
Living people
Medalists at the 2012 Summer Paralympics
Azerbaijani female judoka
Paralympic medalists in judo
20th-century Azerbaijani women
21st-century Azerbaijani women